West Cornforth is a village in County Durham, in England. It is situated to the south of Cornforth, near the A1(M) motorway, Ferryhill and Spennymoor.
It is known locally as “Doggie” though the etymology of this name is uncertain. It may however, relate to the fact that dog irons were made there at one time.
The village was recently awarded 'Calor Durham Village of the Year'.

Notable people 
 Sir Moir Lockhead OBE, DHC (born 1945), businessman, was educated at West Cornforth Secondary Modern.  NB West Cornforth school used to be an Infants School, Junior Mixed, then Senior School with pupils  a School Leavers Certificate at age 15 years. All pupils would sit an 11 Plus exam and those who passed would qualify for Grammar School, normally Spennymoor. West Cornforth School was never of Secondary Modern status.
Gordon Cowans -footballer, most famous for his career at Aston Villa F.C.

References 

Villages in County Durham